Phoenix International Holdings, Inc. (Phoenix) is a marine services company that performs manned and unmanned underwater operations worldwide. Phoenix was incorporated in 1996 as Phoenix Marine, Inc. and started doing business in 1997. It changed its name in January 2000 to Phoenix International, Inc., and then to Phoenix International Holdings, Inc. in November 2007, when it became an employee-owned company.

The company’s core business segments include waterborne ship repairs; underwater inspection, maintenance and repair; deep ocean search and recovery; submarine rescue; and marine engineering.  They provide expertise in underwater welding (wet and dry chamber); non-destructive testing; conventional and one-atmosphere manned diving; and side scan sonar, Autonomous Underwater Vehicle (AUV), and Remotely Operated Vehicle (ROV) operations.  The marine engineering services that Phoenix provides include unmanned underwater vehicles, underwater robotics, cofferdams and weight handling fixtures, and diving systems. Its customers include U.S. and foreign navies and government agencies; the oil and gas, subsea mining and entertainment industries; and the archaeological community.

Notable projects
Notable projects in which Phoenix has participated include:
2022-Location and Recovery of a downed U.S. Navy F-35C Lightning II aircraft in South China sea  
2021-Location and Recovery of the fuselage of a downed MH-60S Seahawk Helicopter in Okinawa 
2019-Deep Ocean Salvage of C-2A Aircraft (location and recovery) in 18,809ft 
2014-The search for Malaysia Airlines Flight 370;
Air France Flight 447, Yemenia Flight 626, Adam Air Flight 574, and Tuninter Flight 1153 black box recoveries;
2012-Search for Amelia Earhart Airplane 
2011-Submarine Rescue Readiness Exercise with Bold Monarch 
2010-Forensic inspection of the Deepwater Horizon control room;
2010-The design, fabrication, and testing of a Saturation Fly-Away Diving System (SAT FADS) for the U.S. Navy;
2003-The search for Space Shuttle Columbia debris;
2003- documentary investigations and mapping projects;
2002- turret recovery;
2000-The discovery and forensic survey of the Israeli submarine ;

References

External links 
 Phoenix International Home Page

Diving engineering
Engineering companies of the United States